The vehicle registration plates of Chad is a legal form requiring the citizens of Chad to have the car registered.

Regular license plates

The current scheme of regular license plates of Chad was introduced in 2001. It is based on the French FNI system and has a format of 12A3456B, where 12 is the region code, A is a vehicle type indicator, 3456 is a number, and B is a series. Regular plates have a white background with black markings. On the right is the emblem of the Central African Economic and Monetary Community (CEMAS) and the TSN code.

Regional coding

Until 2008, the number of Chad regions was 18. Since 2008, due to the fragmentation of some previous regions, 4 more regions have been added, which are given codes 19-22. In 2012, the Ennedi Region was divided. There is no information about the assignment of the new code 23 yet.

 01 — Al-Batkha
 02 — Burku 
 03 — Shari-Bakirmi 
 04 — Kira
 05 — Khajar-Lamis
 06 — Kanim
 07 — Al-Bukhaira
 08 — Al-Harbi
 09 — Loocooni Ash-Sharki
 10 — Mandun
 11 — Mayou-Kibi Ash-Sharki
 12 — Mayou-Kibi Al-Harb
 13 — Shari Al-Afsat
 14 — Waddai
 15 — Salyamat
 16 — Tabdjili
 17 — Wadi-Fira
 18 — Ndjamena
 19 — Bakhar Al-Hazal
 20 — Innidi
 21 — Silya
 22 — Tibasti

Coding by type of vehicle

 B — bus
 C — heavy passenger car (jeep, minivan, pickup, etc.)
 M — motorcycles 
 MS — special motorcycles
 P — freight transport
 S — special transport 
 T — freight transport (tractors)
 V — cars

Other formats

Taxis

Taxis have license plates in a format that coincides with the regular one, ie 12A3456B. Character color is white, background color is blue.

Temporary license plates

Temporary license plates for tourists have a red background with white or black symbols. The format of such characters is 12A3456TT, where 12 is the region code, A is the vehicle type indicator, 3456 is the number, TT is the temporality indicator.

State license plate

State license plates have black symbols on a yellow background and the format AB1234B, where AB is a pointer (type of apparatus), 1234 is a number, and B is a vehicle type code.

Police

Police license plates have the format PN1234, where PN is a sign (NATIONAL POLICE), 1234 is a number. License plates have white symbols on a red background.

Military license plates

License plates of the Armed Forces of Chad have the format T12-3456 and are usually applied to the vehicle with paint: black symbols on a yellow background.

Gendarmes

The license plates of the gendarmes have the format G1 2345. G is the Gendarmerie index. The license plates have black symbols on a yellow background.

Diplomatic license plates

License plates of diplomatic missions have the format 12CMD34, where 12 - country code, CMD - index of the head of the diplomatic mission, 34 - number.

License plates of other diplomats

License plates of diplomatic personnel have the format 12A34CD, where 12 is the country code, A is the vehicle type code, 34 is the number, CD is the index of the diplomatic corps.

Administrative and technical staff

License plates of administrative and technical personnel of diplomatic missions have the format 12РАТ345, where 12 is the country code, РАТ is the index of the corresponding type of staff, 345 is the number.

Technical staff of international cooperation missions

License plates of this type have the format 12РСТ345, where 12 is the country code, РСТ is the index of the corresponding type of personnel, 345 is the number.

Honorary consuls

Honorary consuls have license plates of the format ССН12A3456B, where ССН is the index of the honorary consul, 12 is the code of the country, A is the code of the TK type, 3456 is the number, B is the series.

References

External links

 

Chad